Jaime Reis (born December 1983) is a composer from Lisbon, Portugal whose music has been presented in Portugal, Poland, Turkey, Brazil, Singapore, Hong Kong, Taiwan, France, Austria, Ukraine and Belgium.

Works
2018
	
Aera excipere
	
12 flutes
2018
	
Sândalo Prata
	
Flute and guitar
2017
	
Voces excipere
	
12 soloist voices
2017
	
Fluxus, pas trop haut dans le ciel
	
16 channels in a dome distribution. 
2017
	
Fluxus, Dimensionless sound (B)
	
Flute and electronics
2017
	
Bartolomeu, o voador,
	
Piano and electronics - didactic piece
2017
	
Inverso Sangue:  Cinábrio (III)
	
Violin, viola and cello
2017
	
Inverso Sangue: Granito (B) (II)
	
Saxophone, violin and cello
2017
	
Inverso Sangue: Granito (II)
	
Clarinet, violin and cello
2017
	
Inverso Sangue: Âmbar (I)
	
Clarinet
2016
	
A Omnisciência é um Colectivo - Part IV
	
Percussion and electronics
2016
	
Bartolomeu, o voador,
	
Children's choir, recitant and electronics
2016
	
Sangue Inverso: Obsidiana (III)
	
Flute, clarinet and piano
2016
	
Sangue Inverso: Magnetite (I)
	
Piano - didactic piece
2016
	
Sangue Inverso: Ametista (II)
	
Piano and flute
2015
	
Sangue Inverso: Ametista (B) (II)
	
Piano and recorder
2015
	
Sangue Inverso: Olho de Tigre (VI)
	
Piano, violin, viola and cello
2015
	
Fluxus, Drag
	
Cello, double bass and electronics
2015
	
Jeux de l’Espace
	
Electronics (8 + PLA)
2015
	
A Omnisciência é um Colectivo - Part III
	
Electronics and piano
2014
	
GS65
	
Viola solo
2012/2014
	
Fluxus, Dimensionless sound
	
Flute glissando headjoint and electronics
2013
	
Fluxus, Transitional Flow
	
Viola and electronics
2013
	
Fluxus, Lift

Electronics
2010/2011
	
A Anamnese das Constantes Ocultas
	
Ensemble and electronics (6 + PLA)
2009/2011
	
A Omnisciência é um Colectivo - Part II
	
Electronics and wind orchestra
2009
	
A Omnisciência é um Colectivo - Part I
	
Electronics
2008
	
Estudos de Densidades II
	
Ensemble - didactic piece
2007
	
Sinais no Tempo
	
Guitar and electronics
2006
	
Densidades Emergentes
	
Orchestra
2005
	
Reificação Espectral
	
Orchestra and electronics
2005
	
Density Study
	
Robot orchestra
2004
	
Improvisação sobre três poemas de Al Berto
	
Orchestra
2004
	
(Sobre o processo de) Replicação
	
2 flutes, 2 percussionists
2003/2004
	
Phonopolis
	
Electronics
2003
	
Síntese
	
Orchestra
2003
	
Lysozyme Synthesis
	
Piano
2002
	
Calmodulin Synthesis
	
5 percussionist
2001/2003
	
Estátua de Pessanha
	
Piano, bass flute and real-time video

Papers
– Akademia Muzyczna Kraków, Três conferências sobre história da Música em Portugal, 2003
– “Breve história do desenvolvimento da tecnologia electrónica aplicada à composição musical”, 4º Encontro da Secção Portuguesa da AES (Audio Engineering Society), Universidade de Aveiro, June 2003
– Modelos matemáticos applicados à composição musical – Um meio ou um fim?, Escola Superior de Turismo e Telecomunicações de Seia, 2004
– “Biological models applied to musical composition”, Musical Thinking Today forum, 42. Internationale Ferienkurse für Neue Musik, Darmstadt, 2004
– Graz, Áustria | Hörfest | compositor convidado juntamente com o Miso Ensemble | estreia: Lysozyme Synthesis, 2005
– “Phonopolis” – apresentação da peça nas Listening Rooms da International Computer Music Conference (ICMC), Barcelona, 2005
– Festivais de Música Electroacústica como produtos de Turismo, June 2006, Escola Superior de Turismo e Telecomunicações de Seia
– International Summer School of Systematic Musicology, Gent, Belgium, 2006
– A Música Electrónica de Luciano Berio, March 2007, Conservatório de Música de Seia
– “Biological Models and Music Composition”, poster apresentado no congresso “Musica e Genética”, Bologna, Italy, May 2007
– Introdução à História da Música em Portugal, Biblioteca Municipal de Palmela, May 2007
– Model ASEM, Cultural Pillar, Beijing, China, 2008
– Stockhausen Courses, Kürten, Germany, 2009 – moderator of the Forum for Music Educators
– Helsinki University, ASEFUAN AGM, Helsinki, Finland, 2010
– participant, 15th ASEF University, Woosuk University, Wanju, Jeonbuk Province, South Korea, 2009
– Model ASEM, guest speaker – “On the Cultural Policies in Portugal”, Sciences Po, Le Havre, France, 2009
– Gulbenkian Foundation – Introdução à obra Luiz Vaz 73, de Jorge Peixinho e Ernesto de Sousa – Lisbon, CAM, 2009
– ASEF's Rapporteur – COP15 – “Arts, Culture and Sustainability: Building Synergies between Asia and Europe” and “Culture | Futures: The Transition to an Ecological Age 2050,” Denmark, December 2009
– Keio University, ASEFUAN AGM, Tokyo, Japan, 2010
– UNICAMP – Composition Lecture, Brazil, September 2010
– Salvador na Bahia, Brazil – UFBA – Composition Lectures – Guest composer at III FIMC – Festival Internacional de Música Contemporânea (along with composer Paulo Chagas, conductor Pedro Pinto Figueiredo and guitar player Pedro Rodrigues), September 2010
– Encontro Internacional de Música e Arte Sonora – EIMAS – “De Entretecimento a Omnisciência”, UFRJ /UNIRIO – Juiz de Fora e Rio de Janeiro, September 2010
– Culturgest, Lisboa – “Luís Vaz 73, uma possível reconstituição ou a reconstituição possível?”, Jorge Peixinho – Mémoires... Miroirs, October, 2010
– “Música Electroacústica e Espacialização”, Sociedade Portuguesa de Acústica, Laboratório Nacional de Engenharia Civil – November 2010

References 
Jaime Reis in Classical Composers (English)
Jaime Reis at Lisbon's multidisciplinary research center Instituto de Etnomusicologia – Centro de Estudos em Música e Dança (English)
article À Volta da Electroacústica in Produção Áudio journal by André Pires (Portuguese)
Jaime Reis in Music Information Centre (English)
Jaime Reis in Studio Banana(Spanish)
Jaime Reis news in Greek newspaper gnomionline (Greek)
Jaime Reis in Hoerfest(English)
in GenosLab (Portuguese)
tribute in Artis (Portuguese)
radio program from RUC (Portuguese)
Jaime Reis in Logos Foundation (Dutch)
Jaime Reis in Chinese newspaper english.eastday (English)
Jaime Reis in Chinese newspaper english.eastday (English)
Jaime Reis in Chinese newspaper news.cctv.com (Chinese)
in the Philippines GMA NEWS http://www.gmanetwork.com/ (English)

Peixinho, J., & de Sousa, E. (2012). Recording: Performance Almada, Um Nome de Guerra e Nós Não Estamos Algures na Casa de Serralves ; Grupo de Música Contemporânea de Lisboa; M. Jaime Reis. Ernesto de Sousa Centro de Estudos - Multidisciplinares (cemes). Retrieved from http://www.ernestodesousa.com/?p=446

CD: Caminhos de Orfeu - Obras encomendadas pelo Grupo de Música Contemporânea de Lisboa - Electroacoustics Technical Assistance Adviser: Jaime Reis. (2012). Sabadell, Barcelona: La Mà de Guido.

Reis, J. (2015). CD: Fluxus, Transition Flow; Portuguese Contemporary Music for Viola and Electronics; viola: João Pedro Delgado. Guarda, Portugal: SÍNTESE-GMC RECORD LABEL. Retrieved from https://itunes.apple.com/pt/album/portuguese-contemporary-music/id957574297

Reis, J. (2016). Calmodulin Synthesis, for 5 percussionists (2002). Parede: PORTUGUESE MUSIC RESEARCH & INFORMATION CENTRE. Retrieved from www.mic.pt

Reis, J. (2005). Introdução ao pensamento musical de João Rafael. Centro de Informação Da Música Portuguesa, 1–10. Retrieved from www.mic.pt

Reis, J., & Martel, P. (2013). Modelos e Estruturas Biológicas Aplicadas à Composição Musical e Arte Computacional. In P. Martel (Ed.), I Colóquio Internacional Arte e Ciência em Diálogo. Universidade do Algarve.

Reis, J. (2015). Perception and Reception of Emmanuel Nunes’s musical practice. In G. Stöck, P. F. de Castro, & K. Stöck (Eds.), Estes sons, esta linguagem’. Essays on Music, Meaning and Society in Honour of Mário Vieira de Carvalho. Leipzig: Gudrun Schröder Verlag.

Reis, J. (2015). Parametric loudspeakers array technology: a 4th dimension of space in electronic music? In 1st International Congress for Electroacoustic Music – Electroacoustic Winds 2015. Aveiro.

Reis, J. (2011). Video: Calmodulin Synthesis ; Lisbon Ensemble 20/21 ; M.: Pedro Pinto Figueiredo; Marco Fernandes, Miguel Filipe, Pedro Martins, Fábio Dias, Luís Cascão. MPAGDP - A música portuguesa a gostar dela própria. Retrieved from http://vimeo.com/33237840

Reis, J. (2010). João Rafael. In S. Castelo-Branco (Ed.), Enciclopédia da Música em Portugal no Século XX (p. 1090). Lisboa: Círculo de Leitores.

Reis, J. (2011). CD: A Omnisciência é um Colectivo - parte 2 ; WASBE; União Filarmónica do Troviscal; M. André Granjo. Chiayi City, Taiwan: Mark Records. https://doi.org/ASIN: B00668IFQQ

Reis, J. (2016). Lysozyme Synthesis, for piano (2003). Parede: PORTUGUESE MUSIC RESEARCH & INFORMATION CENTRE. Retrieved from www.mic.pt

Reis, J. (2017). Fluxus, Dimensionless Sound (2012–14), for glissando flute and electronics - score and CD. (E. Drescher, Ed.). Berlin: Verlag Neue Musik.

Reis, J. (2011). Video: Lysozyme Synthesis ; Ana Telles. MPAGDP - A música portuguesa a gostar dela própria. Retrieved from http://vimeo.com/33302763

1983 births
Living people
Portuguese classical composers
21st-century classical composers
Portuguese male classical composers
21st-century male musicians